Tanumoy Ghosh (born 10 December 1987) is a Bangladeshi first-class cricketer who plays for Rajshahi Division. In 2017, he was given a five-year ban by the Bangladesh Cricket Board (BCB), in his role of a team losing a match on purpose in the Dhaka Second Division Cricket League.

See also
 List of Rajshahi Division cricketers

References

External links
 

1987 births
Living people
Bangladeshi cricketers
Rajshahi Division cricketers
People from Rajshahi District